The R388 is a Regional Route in South Africa that connects Douglas with the R48 near De Aar.

External links
 Routes Travel Info

References

Regional Routes in the Northern Cape